David Franklin Houston (February 17, 1866 – September 2, 1940) was an American academic, businessman and Conservative Democrat. He served under President Wilson as the 5th Secretary of Agriculture and the 48th United States Secretary of the Treasury.

Early life and family

Houston was born in Monroe, North Carolina on February 17, 1866. He was the son of William Henry Houston, a horse dealer and grocer, and his wife, the former Pamela Ann Stevens.  He graduated from the University of South Carolina in 1887 and did graduate work at Harvard University, where he received a M.A. in political science in 1892. Houston married Helen Beall on December 11, 1895. They had five children: David Franklin, Jr., Duval, Elizabeth, Helen and Lawrence Reid Houston.

Higher education
Houston taught political science at University of Texas. He became an adjunct member of the faculty in 1894 and was named dean of the faculty in 1899. He then became president of the Agricultural and Mechanical College of Texas (now Texas A&M University) from 1902 until 1905. In 1905 he returned to UT to become that institution's president, serving until 1908. During his tenure at UT Austin, the school opened a doctoral program and a law school.

Houston left Texas to serve as chancellor of Washington University in St. Louis, a position he held from 1908 to 1913. During his tenure he established the School of Architecture and strengthened the medical school through partnerships with Children's and Barnes hospitals.  He left the university to become the U.S. Secretary of Agriculture.

Under President William McKinley he was on the board of visitors of the United States Military Academy at West Point. Later in life, he was an overseer of Harvard University and on the Columbia University Board of Trustees.

Politics and ready for Wilson's administration
Houston served as President Woodrow Wilson's Secretary of Agriculture from 1913 to 1920. During his time as Agriculture Secretary many important agricultural laws were passed by the U.S. Congress, including the Smith-Lever Act, the Farm Loan Act, the Warehouse Act, and the Federal Aid Road Act. However following the Food and Fuel Control Act responsibility for food was handed over to Herbert Hoover at the United States Food Administration. Hoover only accepted the position on the basis he would be free from interference from Houston.

He became the Secretary of the Treasury from 1920–1921 shortly following the First World War. His brief tenure was marked by stormy controversies over federal monetary policies. As ex officio Chairman of the Federal Reserve Board, he issued severe warnings and, increased rediscount rates in order to prevent the inflation that the European allies were experiencing. Houston predicted a fall in U.S. prices, particularly of farm products, after the optimism of the Armistice wore off. He pushed for easier credit for farmers and urged them to produce less.

But when prices fell more dramatically than expected in 1920, farm spokesmen unfairly accused Houston of deliberately wrecking agrarian prosperity. Abroad, England and France were pushing to cancel their war debts. Houston, the U.S. Congress and the President, against cancellation, converted the short-term debts to long-term loans.  Houston resigned at the end of President Wilson's term, after only a year in office.

During his time in government Houston advocated other progressive measures such as the provision of a proper system of personal credit unions, aiding land settlement, the encouragement of farm ownership, and improvements in rural health and sanitation.  In regards to the latter, Houston stated that “To what extent the further projection of effort is a matter for state or local action remains to be determined, but it seems clear that there should be no cessation of activity until there has been completed, in every community of the Union, an effective sanitary survey and, through the provision of adequate machinery, steps taken to control and eliminate the sources of disease and to provide the necessary modern medical and dental facilities easily accessible to the mass of the people.” Houston also argued that "The farmer, as well as the industrial worker, is entitled to a living wage and to a reasonable profit on his investment." He also argued that "We are all in sympathy with rational proposals for the improvement of the masses of the less fortunate people of the Nation and of the world, but this improvement must come by orderly processes. And we must recognize that, after all, the real progress of humanity is slow."

Business
After leaving the U.S. federal government, Houston became as the president of the Bell Telephone Securities and a vice president at AT&T. Houston also served as a director of AT&T, the Guaranty Trust Company and the United States Steel Corporation. He was president of the Mutual Life Insurance Company of New York for ten years.

Death
Houston died of a heart attack on September 2, 1940 at Columbia Presbyterian Medical Center in New York City.  He was buried next to his wife at Saint John's Church Cemetery in Oyster Bay, New York.

Writings
Houston published A Critical Study of Nullification in South Carolina (1896) to establish his place in academia. He later published a two-volume memoir of his experiences as a cabinet member, Eight Years with Wilson's Cabinet.

References

External links
 
 

1866 births
1940 deaths
20th-century American politicians
Chancellors of Washington University in St. Louis
Presidents of the University of Texas at Austin
Candidates in the 1924 United States presidential election
United States Secretaries of Agriculture
United States Secretaries of the Treasury
University of South Carolina alumni
Harvard University alumni
Presidents of Texas A&M University
Columbia University people
People from Monroe, North Carolina
Woodrow Wilson administration cabinet members